The 2023 New England Revolution season is the club's 28th season of existence, and their 28th consecutive season playing in Major League Soccer, the top flight of American soccer. The season began on February 25 when the club began their play in the MLS season. The Revolution will also play in the 2023 U.S. Open Cup and the 2023 Leagues Cup.

Background 

The 2022 season was the Revolution's 27th season of existence, and their 27th season in MLS, the top tier of American soccer. The season began on February 15 when the club began their play in the 2022 CONCACAF Champions League, while the MLS season began on February 26, where the Revolution entered as the defender Supporters' Shield winners, 
and the season concluded on October 9. The Revolution finished the year 10–12–12 (42 points) leaving them 10th in the Eastern Conference and outside of the 2022 MLS Cup Playoffs.  In the 2022 U.S. Open Cup the Revs entered in the Round of 32, defeating FC Cincinnati 5–1, before bowing out in the Round of 16 to New York City FC.

Club

Team management

Roster 

Appearances and goals are career totals from all-competitions.

Non-competitive

Preseason exhibitions

Midseason exhibitions 
None

Competitive

Major League Soccer

Results

U.S. Open Cup

CONCACAF Leagues Cup

East 4

Transfers

Transfers in

Transfers out

MLS SuperDraft picks

Statistics

Appearances and goals

Top scorers 
{| class="wikitable" style="font-size: 100%; text-align: center;"
|-
! style="background:#0C2340; color:#FFFFFF; border:2px solid #C8102E; width:35px;" scope="col"|Rank
! style="background:#0C2340; color:#FFFFFF; border:2px solid #C8102E; width:35px;" scope="col"|Position
! style="background:#0C2340; color:#FFFFFF; border:2px solid #C8102E; width:35px;" scope="col"|No.
! style="background:#0C2340; color:#FFFFFF; border:2px solid #C8102E; width:140px;" scope="col"|Name
! style="background:#0C2340; color:#FFFFFF; border:2px solid #C8102E; width:75px;" scope="col"|
! style="background:#0C2340; color:#FFFFFF; border:2px solid #C8102E; width:75px;" scope="col"|
! style="background:#0C2340; color:#FFFFFF; border:2px solid #C8102E; width:75px;" scope="col"|
! style="background:#0C2340; color:#FFFFFF; border:2px solid #C8102E; width:75px;" scope="col"|
! style="background:#0C2340; color:#FFFFFF; border:2px solid #C8102E; width:75px;" scope="col"|Total
|-
|rowspan="4"|1||DF||4|| Henry Kessler||1 ||0 ||0 ||0 ||1
|-
| DF||15|| Brandon Bye||1 ||0 ||0 ||0 ||1
|-
| FW||17|| Bobby Wood||1 ||0 ||0 ||0 ||1
|-
| MF||11|| Dylan Borrero||1 ||0 ||0 ||0 ||1
|-
!colspan="4"|Total
!4!!0!!0!!0!!4

Top assists 
{| class="wikitable" style="font-size: 100%; text-align: center;"
|-
! style="background:#0C2340; color:#FFFFFF; border:2px solid #C8102E; width:35px;" scope="col"|Rank
! style="background:#0C2340; color:#FFFFFF; border:2px solid #C8102E; width:35px;" scope="col"|Position
! style="background:#0C2340; color:#FFFFFF; border:2px solid #C8102E; width:35px;" scope="col"|No.
! style="background:#0C2340; color:#FFFFFF; border:2px solid #C8102E; width:140px;" scope="col"|Name
! style="background:#0C2340; color:#FFFFFF; border:2px solid #C8102E; width:75px;" scope="col"|
! style="background:#0C2340; color:#FFFFFF; border:2px solid #C8102E; width:75px;" scope="col"|
! style="background:#0C2340; color:#FFFFFF; border:2px solid #C8102E; width:75px;" scope="col"|
! style="background:#0C2340; color:#FFFFFF; border:2px solid #C8102E; width:75px;" scope="col"|Total
|-
|rowspan="6"|1||MF||10|| Carles Gil||1 ||0 ||0 ||1
|-
||MF||11|| Dylan Borrero||1 ||0 ||0 ||1
|-
||DF||15|| Brandon Bye||1 ||0 ||0 ||1
|-
||FW||17|| Bobby Wood||1 ||0 ||0 ||1
|-
||MF||19|| Latif Blessing||1 ||0 ||0 ||1
|-
||DF||24|| DeJuan Jones||1 ||0 ||0 ||1
|-
!colspan="4"|Total
!6!!0!!0!!6

Disciplinary record 
{| class="wikitable" style="font-size: 100%; text-align:center;"
|-
| rowspan="2" !width=15|
| rowspan="2" !width=15|
| rowspan="2" !width=120|Player
| colspan="3"|MLS
| colspan="3"|U.S. Open Cup
| colspan="3"|MLS Cup
| colspan="3"|Total
|-
!width=34; background:#fe9;|
!width=34; background:#fe9;|
!width=34; background:#ff8888;|
!width=34; background:#fe9;|
!width=34; background:#fe9;|
!width=34; background:#ff8888;|
!width=34; background:#fe9;|
!width=34; background:#fe9;|
!width=34; background:#ff8888;|
!width=34; background:#fe9;|
!width=34; background:#fe9;|
!width=34; background:#ff8888;|
|-
|4||DF|| Henry Kessler||1 ||0 ||0 ||0 ||0 ||0 ||0 ||0 ||0 ||1 ||0 ||0
|-
|24||DF|| DeJuan Jones||1 ||0 ||0 ||0 ||0 ||0 ||0 ||0 ||0 ||1 ||0 ||0
|-
|29||MF|| Noel Buck||1 ||0 ||0 ||0 ||0 ||0 ||0 ||0 ||0 ||1 ||0 ||0
|-
!colspan=3|Total !!3!!0!!0!!0!!0!!0!!0!!0!!0!!3!!0!!0

Clean sheets
{| class="wikitable sortable" style="text-align: center;"
|-
! style="background:#0C2340; color:#FFFFFF; border:2px solid #C8102E; width:35px;" scope="col"|No.
! style="background:#0C2340; color:#FFFFFF; border:2px solid #C8102E; width:160px;" scope="col"|Name
! style="background:#0C2340; color:#FFFFFF; border:2px solid #C8102E; width:50px;" scope="col"|
! style="background:#0C2340; color:#FFFFFF; border:2px solid #C8102E; width:50px;" scope="col"|
! style="background:#0C2340; color:#FFFFFF; border:2px solid #C8102E; width:50px;" scope="col"|
! style="background:#0C2340; color:#FFFFFF; border:2px solid #C8102E; width:50px;" scope="col"|
! style="background:#0C2340; color:#FFFFFF; border:2px solid #C8102E; width:50px;" scope="col"|Total
! style="background:#0C2340; color:#FFFFFF; border:2px solid #C8102E; width:50px;" scope="col"|Games
|-
|99|| Djordje Petrovic||2 ||0 ||0 ||0 ||2 ||2
|-

See also 
 2023 New England Revolution II season

References

External links 
 New England Revolution

New England Revolution seasons
New England Revolution
New England Revolution
2023 in sports in Massachusetts
Sports competitions in Foxborough, Massachusetts
New England